Events from the year 1990 in Kuwait.

Incumbents
Emir: Jaber Al-Ahmad Al-Jaber Al-Sabah
Prime Minister: Saad Al-Salim Al-Sabah

Events
July to September
 August 2 – Iraq invaded Kuwait. See: Gulf War

Births

 12 May – Ibrahim Majid.
 11 August – Talal Al Fadhel.
 9 October – Yousef Nasser.

Deaths
 17 June – Ahmad Meshari Al-Adwani
 2 August – Fahad Al-Ahmed Al-Jaber Al-Sabah

References

 
Kuwait
Kuwait
Years of the 20th century in Kuwait
1990s in Kuwait